Sage computer may refer to:
 SAGE Computer Technology. m68k computer system company in the 1980s
 Semi-Automatic Ground Environment (SAGE), a system of mainframe computers and networking equipment that directed and controlled NORAD response to a possible Soviet air attack between the late 1950s snf the 1980s.  It was the largest, most powerful, and most expensive computer system ever at the time of its construction.

See also
 AN/FSQ-7, a computerized command and control system used in the USAF Semi-Automatic Ground Environment (SAGE) air defense network